Tendring is a village and civil parish in Essex. It gives its name to the Tendring District and before that the Tendring Hundred. Its name was given to the larger groupings because it was at the centre, not because it was larger than the other settlements. In 2011 the parish had a population of 736 and the district had a population of 138,048. The linear village straddles the B1035 from Manningtree to Thorpe-le-Soken.

The parish includes the settlements of Goose Green, Tendring Green and Tendring Heath. The church is dedicated to St Edmund. The Tendring Union Workhouse was located at Tendring Heath.

Transport
The village is on the B1035 road and close to the A120 road. There are bus services to Clacton-on-Sea and Colchester.

References

 
Villages in Essex
Civil parishes in Essex

External links
 St Edmund King & Martyr Church website